Eyendorf is a municipality in the district of Harburg, in Lower Saxony, Germany.

References

External links
 Official website

Harburg (district)